Amagi may refer to:

 Amagi, Fukuoka, a former city in Japan
 Amagi, Kagoshima, a town in Japan
 Mount Amagi, a range of volcanic mountains in Shizuoka Prefecture, Japan
 Ama-gi, an ancient Sumerian word and teaching

Transportation 
 Amagi Line (disambiguation), two Japanese railways
 Amagi Station, a railway station in Fukuoka Prefecture, Japan

Military 
 , an early vessel of the Imperial Japanese Navy
 , a vessel in the Imperial Japanese Navy, sister ship of Akagi
 , World War II

People 
 Seimaru Amagi, pen name for manga storywriter Shin Kibayashi
 Shūsuke Amagi, light novel writer for Chrome Shelled Regios

Fictional characters 
 Yukiko Amagi, from the video game series Persona 4
 Kouga Amagi, Konoha Amagi, and other Amagi family members from the manga and anime series Zetman
 Saika Amagi, from the video game .hack//Link
 Yuki Amagi, from the manga and anime series Legendz
 Hiiro Amagi and Rinne Amagi, singers from the franchise Ensemble Stars!

See also 
 Amagi Brilliant Park, a Japanese light novel series
 "Amagi-goe", song by Sayuri Ishikawa